A corporate resolution is a corporate action, sometimes in the form of a legal document, that will be voted on or has been voted on at a meeting of the board of directors for a corporation. The resolution could also be in the form of a "corporate action" which has the same binding effect as an action taken at a duly called meeting. For a corporate action, if allowed by state law and by the bylaws of the corporation, the board of directors may use a written document to waive formal notice of a meeting and unanimously consent to a resolution.

The resolution could be on just about any subject. One common subject, because it is required by banks and securities firms to open accounts, is to define which individuals are authorized to act on behalf of a corporation. This form of corporate resolution is also required by title agencies when selling corporate owned real estate. The form and structure of this document varies depending on the state in which the corporation is organized.

Resolutions are not required on Trust or Estate accounts. See: Trust law.

References

External links
 Wikibooks Debate/Motions and resolutions

Resolutions (law)
Board of directors
Management cybernetics